The 1905–06 Northern Rugby Football Union season was the 11th season of rugby league football.

Season summary

Leigh won the Championship for the first time this season and Bradford their first Challenge Cup.

The two divisions were combined into one competition, with Lancaster dropping out to reduce it to 31 teams. Clubs from the same county all played each other, and arranged inter-county matches as and when they could. Because not all clubs played the same number of matches positions were decided on percentages. 

Featherstone Rovers, who were an amateur team at this time knocked a professional side out of the Challenge Cup, when they beat Widnes 23-2 in the second round.

There was no county league competition this season. The inaugural Rugby league county cups took place this season, and Wigan beat Leigh 0–0 (replay 8–0) to win the Lancashire Cup, and Hunslet beat Halifax 13–3 to win the Yorkshire County Cup.

Championship

Challenge Cup

Bradford beat Salford 5-0 in the final at Leeds before a crowd of 15,834 to win the Cup in their first appearance in the final.

Sources
1905-06 Rugby Football League season at wigan.rlfans.com
The Challenge Cup at The Rugby Football League website

References

1905 in English rugby league
1906 in English rugby league
Northern Rugby Football Union seasons